Myosin-XVIIIb is a protein that in humans is encoded by the MYO18B gene.

The protein encoded by this gene may regulate muscle-specific genes when in the nucleus and may influence intracellular trafficking when in the cytoplasm. The encoded protein functions as a homodimer and may interact with F actin. Mutations in this gene are associated with lung cancer.

References

Further reading